Discozerconidae is a small family of mites in the order Mesostigmata.

Species
Discozerconidae contains three genera, with four recognized species:

 Genus Berzercon Seeman & Baker, 2013
 Berzercon ferdinandi Seeman & Baker, 2013
 Genus Discozercon Berlese, 1910
 Discozercon derricki Domrow, 1956
 Discozercon mirabilis Berlese, 1910
 Genus Discomegistus Trägårdh, 1911
 Discomegistus pectinatus Trägårdh, 1911

References

External links

Mesostigmata
Acari families